The 2019 European Parliament election in the Czech Republic was held on 24 and 25 May 2019, electing the 21 members of the Czech delegation to the European Parliament as part of the European elections held across the European Union.

The result was a victory of the populist ruling party ANO (ALDE), with 21.18 per cent and 6 seats, 2 more seats than in 2014 election. Followed by conservative ODS (ECR), with 14.54 per cent and 4 seats, marking a notable growth in the election. The Pirate Party also made major gains. SPD (ENF) gained seats in its first European election, while KDU-ČSL (EPP), TOP 09/STAN (EPP) and KSČM (GUE/NGL) lost seats. ČSSD (S&D) did not cross 5% threshold for the first time, as well as Svobodní (EFDD).

Background
Previous election was held in 2014. ANO 2011 has won the previous election followed by TOP 09. Civic Democratic Party has suffered losses and Czech Social Democratic Party had disappointing result.

Christian and Democratic Union – Czechoslovak People's Party announced on 19 May 2018 that it will be led by MEP Pavel Svoboda during 2019 election. Christian Democrats admitted to consider joint list with TOP 09 and Mayors and Independents. Christian Democrats announced on 28 November 2018 the will run independently.

Jan Zahradil became Alliance of Conservatives and Reformists in Europe candidate for the President of the European Commission and thus the election leader of Civic Democratic Party. Zahradil launched pan-European campaign of Alliance of Conservatives and Reformists in Europe on 28 November 2018. Zahradil stated that his Zahradil was confirmed as party's election leader on 10 December 2018. In national election polls, which use similar system (the only difference being national candidate list compared to regional for national elections), ODS polls at second place with 14-16%, which would give them 4 MEP's.

Czech Social Democratic Party announced Pavel Poc as the leading candidate of the party on 30 November 2018. Josef Středula was reportedly offered the position but refused it. Poc was confirmed as electoral leader on 27 January 2019.

Mayors and Independents announced on 7 December 2018 that Stanislav Polčák will be party's election leader. The party stated they negotiate with TOP 09, SNK European Democrats and Liberal-Environmental Party about joint list for the election.

Czech Pirate Party launched its primaries for the election on 10 December 2018. Mikuláš Peksa expressed his intention to become electoral leader of the party and entered the primaries. He was eventually defeated by Marcel Kolaja who became party's electoral leader on 19 January 2019.

Communist Party of Bohemia and Moravia chose Kateřina Konečná as the electoral leader on 15 December 2018.

TOP 09 announced its leader Jiří Pospíšil as the electoral leader on 25 January 2019.

Parties

Campaign

ANO 2011
Dita Charanzová was introduced as the electoral leader of ANO 2011 on 17 February 2019.

The party launched its campaign on 2 May 2019. It uses the slogan "We will protect Czech strongly and without compromises." The party introduced baseball caps with the slogan "Strong Czechia" which is inspired by Donald Trump's 2016 presidential campaign. Charanzová promised strong Czechia in a strong Europe, fighting against illegal migration and fighting against low quality grocery.

ANO 2011 used Gamekeepers's exhibition Natura Viva. Prime Minister Andrej Babiš and Minister of Environment attended party's meeting there along with Dita Charanzová

ANO 2011 concluded itc campaign on 23 May when Dita CHaranzová was doing contact campaign and handing out Doughnut to potential voters.

Christian and Democratic Union - Czechoslovak People's Party (KDU-ČSL)
KDU-ČSL concluded campaign on 23 May when its candidates met with party's supporters at Anděl to sing Ode to Joy.

Civic Democratic Party (ODS)

The Civic Democratic Party is led by Jan Zahradil. The list of candidates was announced on 21 January 2018. It includes, besides Zahradil, MEP Evžen Tošenovský, former Minister of Defense Alexandr Vondra, MP Veronika Vrecionová and others. The party is a member of the Alliance of Conservatives and Reformists in Europe. Zahradil is a leading candidate of the European Conservatives and Reformists group. The party focuses on reform of the European Union.

The party introduced its election slogan "We are the Heart of Europe and we want to be heard" on 16 March 2019.

ODS launched its campaign during a meeting on 2 May 2019. Zahradil stated that the party aims for a less bureaucratic and more flexible Europe. Petr Fiala, leader of ODS, stated that the party plans to support safe outer borders of the European Union, open borders within the European Union and free trade without "useless regulations". He also promised large-scale legal cleaning of European law.

Zahradil reacted to the campaign of ANO 2011 that was launched on 2 May 2019. He noted that ODS previously used the slogan "Strong Czechia" during the campaign for the 2017 legislative election. He also stated that ANO 2011 copied the election program of ODS.

ODS released a campaign advertisement on 12 May 2019. It reminds voters of previous and current scandals of Andrej Babiš.

Civic Democratic Party concluded campaign on 24 May when Jan Zahradil was doing contact campaign along with supporters of the party and was handing out leaflets to voters.

Czech Social Democratic Party (ČSSD)
Social Democrats chose Pavel Poc as the electoral leader. The party launched its campaign on 23 April 2019. It focuses on the fight against poor-quality grocery.

Czech Pirate Party

The Pirates are led by Marcel Kolaja. The party is not currently represented in the European Parliament. Kolaja stated that it could join Alliance of Liberals and Democrats for Europe group or Greens–European Free Alliance group after the election. The party launched its campaign on 3 March 2019.

Pirates launched their campaign on 29 April 2019 with a petition against Andrej Babiš. The party's campaign utilises the slogan "Europe needs Pirates."

Pirate Party used a virtual reality workshop during its campaign. Printed Pirate Newspapers included a hologram of Ivan Bartoš, visible when someone aims their mobile phone camera at title page of Pirate Newspapers. The Pirate Party also published so-called Peksaso (named after Mikuláš Peksa) which is a pexeso whose pictures are based on the election program of the Pirates.

Pirates held a meeting with voters at Havlíčkův Brod square on 19 May 2019 where they build an Election Town. There were attractions for people such as Musical performance or bouncy castle for children. Marcel Kolaja called people to vote as the election is important. Pirates also decided to hold a meeting in Olomouc. One of main planned attractions were ponies as a ride for children. Electoral leader Marcel Kolaja disagreed with ponies as he viewed it as an animal abuse which resulted in a party's election whether party members want the pony even at the cost of not having Kolaja at the meeting. Pirates eventually voted they prefer Ponies.

Pirates concluded campaign on 24 May when party's leader Ivan Bartoš was driving through the Prague by a bus with DJ Music.

Freedom and Direct Democracy (SPD)
The Freedom and Direct Democracy is running for the first time in a European parliament election. They are with Movement for a Europe of Nations and Freedom. The party launched its campaign on 25 April 2019.

Svobodní
Svobodní launched campaign on 20 April 2019. Vít Jedlička was announced as its leader. The party is running with support of Joyful Czech Republic. The party's campaign is somewhat less Eurosceptic than in previous years. The party wants to focus on the reform of the European Union. Jedlička stated that Svobodní wants the Czech Republic to remain in the European Union and would support exit from the European Union only if reform does not occur.

On 11 May 2016 Svobodní began its election campaign. Its party members and supporters started printing electoral newspapers.

Svobodní decided to finance its campaign through crowdfunding on the website HitHit. Their target is 350,000 CZK.

STAN and TOP 09

On 25 January 2019 was Jiří Pospíšil, leader of the TOP 09 party, announced as the electoral leader of the coalition. In addition to Jiří Pospíšil (TOP 09), the candidate list includes Stanislav Polčák (STAN), MEP Luděk Niedermayer (TOP 09), Marek Ženíšek (TOP 09) and others. All elected members of the European Parliament would be in the European People's Party group.

In January 2019 TOP 09 had announced its desire to negotiate with the political movement Mayors and Independents (STAN) about a joint candidate list for the European Parliament election in 2019. Mayors and Independents party itself had previously announced an agreement of a cooperation with the Green party and numerous regional subjects in the European Parliament election. On 18 February 2019 both party leaders, Petr Gazdík (STAN) and Jiří Pospíšil (TOP 09), signed an agreement on cooperation in the European Parliament election. The assembled coalition was targeting European Union supporters.

The party's MEP Luděk Niedermayer launched a website called My Europe to support European Union by retelling real experiences and stories of Bohemian, Moravian and Silesian citizens, who feel like European citizens at the same time. The campaign aims to inform civil society about the European Union without a political context.

TOP 09 and Mayors and Independents coalition made a campaign commercial inspired by the iconic film Cosy Dens. The commercial quickly went viral on social networks. The campaign was aimed at pro-European voters.

Debates

Opinion polls

Vote share

Seats

Results

European groups

Elected MEPs

Notes

References

Czech Republic
European Parliament elections in the Czech Republic
2019 elections in the Czech Republic
May 2019  events in the Czech Republic